The Divided Heart is a 1954  British black-and-white drama film directed by Charles Crichton and starring Cornell Borchers, Yvonne Mitchell and Armin Dahlen. The film is based on a true story of a child, whose father was a member of Slovenian Partisans executed by Nazis and whose mother was deported to the Auschwitz concentration camp, while little Ivan was, like other 300 babies and young children from Slovenia, whose parents were declared Banditen by Nazis, sent to Germany in a Nazi program known as Lebensborn.

It was made at Ealing Studios with sets designed by the art director Edward Carrick. Location shooting took place around St. Johann in Tirol in Austria. The script was written by Jack Whittingham and Richard Hughes. It was produced by Michael Truman and edited by Peter Bezencenet, with cinematography by Otto Heller and music by Georges Auric. The Divided Heart was widely admired, and won three British Academy Film Awards.

Crichton said he was "deeply emotionally involved with" the film which he said "just about broke even."

Plot
During the Second World War, a three-year-old boy is found wandering alone in Germany.  No family can be traced, and it is presumed that his parents and siblings have been casualties of war.  The child is placed in an orphanage, from where he is subsequently adopted by a childless couple, whom he grows to love and accept as his parents.  When the boy is 10 years old, his natural mother is found alive in Yugoslavia where she has survived the war as a refugee.  She travels to Germany to claim her child, having lost her husband and two other children in the war.  The film focuses on the moral dilemma of the situation:  should the child remain with the adoptive parents who have given him a loving and happy home, or be returned to his natural mother who has lost everything else, and to what extent should the child's own wishes be taken into account?  The case is finally referred to a three-man court, who will decide the child's future.  As in the true story on which the film is based, he is returned to his biological mother.

Cast

 Cornell Borchers as Inga
 Yvonne Mitchell as Sonja
 Armin Dahlen as Franz
 Alexander Knox as Chief Justice
 Geoffrey Keen as Marks
 Liam Redmond as First Justice
 Eddie Byrne as Second Justice
 Theodore Bikel as Josip
 Pamela Stirling as Mlle. Poncet
 Michel Ray as Toni (aged 10)
 Martin Stephens as Hans
 André Mikhelson as Professor Miran
 John Schlesinger as the Ticket Collector
 Richard Molinas as Herr Pieter 
 Krystyna Rumistrzewicz as	Mitzi
 Mark Gübhard	as	Max
 John Welsh as Chief Marshall
 Alec McCowen as Reporter
 Marianne Walla as Matron
 Guy Deghy as Schoolteacher 
 Philo Hauser as Schoolteacher
 Carl Duering as 	Postman

Reception and awards
The Divided Heart was a popular and critical success, being highly praised for its sensitivity, emotional impact and the even-handedness with which it dealt with its subject matter.  While noting that the film's ending reportedly left many viewers feeling disappointed and let down, critics conceded that it would have been impossible for a storyline of this nature to reach a conclusion which pleased everyone.  In a contemporary review in The New York Times, noted critic Bosley Crowther wrote: "This is a bleak, heart-rending problem, as it is finely presented in this film with exceptionally sensitive understanding and scrupulous integrity. And the fact that it cannot be unraveled to the satisfaction of all...is simply an indication that a happy solution is beyond the power of a man as wise as Solomon—or even the author of the script—to hit upon."

Awards
The Divided Heart was nominated in six categories at the 1955 British Academy Film Awards and won three, with Mitchell being named Best British Actress and Borchers picking up the Best Foreign Actress award.  Separate awards for British and foreign actresses were given between 1952 and 1967 (after which they were combined into one Best Actress award), and this was the only year in which both awards were won by actresses from the same film.  The film also won the UN Award.  It also received nominations in the Best Film and Best British Film categories, and Whittingham was nominated for Best British Screenplay.  In the U.S., The Divided Heart was named among the top 5 foreign films at the 1955 National Board of Review Awards.

References

External links 
 
 

1954 films
1954 drama films
British drama films
British legal films
Ealing Studios films
British black-and-white films
British courtroom films
Films about adoption
Films directed by Charles Crichton
Films set in Germany
Films shot in Austria
Films scored by Georges Auric
Films with screenplays by Jack Whittingham
1950s English-language films
1950s British films